The 1949 SFR Yugoslavia Chess Championship was the 5th edition of SFR Yugoslav Chess Championship. Held in Zagreb, SFR Yugoslavia, SR Croatia. The tournament was won by Svetozar Gligorić.

Table and results

References 

Yugoslav Chess Championships
1949 in chess
Chess